Abdal is a village in Amritsar. Amritsar is a district in the Indian state of Punjab. Abdal is located in Amritsar-I tehsil of Amritsar district. As per census 2011, population of this village is 3,170 persons. There are 579 households in Abdal.

References 

Villages in Amritsar district